South Field may refer to:

South Field, Berkshire, a location in England
South Field, East Riding of Yorkshire, a location in England
South Field (Iwo Jima), World War II airfield in Japan
South Field (Provo), Utah, soccer stadium in the United States

See also
Southfield (disambiguation)